Leonardo Corti (born 29 January 1981) is an Argentine footballer who plays for Sportivo Peñarol as a goalkeeper.

References

External links

1981 births
Living people
Association football goalkeepers
Argentine footballers
Club Almagro players
Asociación Atlética Luján de Cuyo players
Club Sportivo Ben Hur players
9 de Julio de Rafaela players
San Martín de San Juan footballers
Argentine Primera División players
Primera Nacional players
Sportspeople from Buenos Aires Province